Greya suffusca is a moth of the family Prodoxidae. It is found in the Sierra Nevada near Sequoia National Park in California. The habitat consists of oak and mixed oak-conifer forest.

The wingspan is 12.5–20 mm. The forewings are brown irrorated with white scales. Female are usually darker and more patterned. The hindwings are uniformly grey.

The larvae feed on Osmorhiza brachypoda. Young larvae feed on the developing seeds of their host plant.

References

Moths described in 1992
Prodoxidae
Taxa named by Donald R. Davis (entomologist)